The following Union Army units and commanders fought in the Battle of Camp Wildcat (also known as Wildcat Mountain and Camp Wild Cat) of the American Civil War on October 21, 1861, in Laurel County, Kentucky. The Confederate order of battle is listed separately.

Abbreviations used

Military rank
 BG = Brigadier General
 Col = Colonel
 Cpt = Captain

Union Army
BG Albin F. Schoepf
Col Theophilus T. Garrard [in command until the arrival of Schoepf]

See also

 Kentucky in the American Civil War

References
 Battle, J. H., et al. Kentucky: A History of the State (Louisville, KY: F. A. Battey, 1885).
 The Official Records of the War of the Rebellion, Ser. 1, Vol. 4, pp. 280–316.
 Ohio Roster Commission. Official Roster of the Soldiers of the State of Ohio in the War on the Rebellion, 1861–1865, Compiled Under the Direction of the Roster Commission 12 vol. (Akron, OH: Werner Co.), 1886–1895.
 Reid, Whitelaw. Ohio in the War: Her Statesmen, Her Generals, and Soldiers (Cincinnati, OH: Moore, Wilstach, & Baldwin), 1868.

External links
 National Park Service, Daniel Boone National Forest, Camp Wildcat battle site, photos, and description
 National Park Service Battle Summary
 Camp Wildcat Preservation Foundation

American Civil War orders of battle